"The Liberty Bell" (1893) is an American military march composed by John Philip Sousa.

History 
"The Liberty Bell", at the time a new composition as yet untitled, was written for Sousa's unfinished operetta "The Devil's Deputy" before financing for the show fell through. Shortly afterwards, while attending the Columbian Exposition in Chicago, Sousa and his band manager George Hinton watched the spectacle "America", in which a backdrop depicting the Liberty Bell was lowered. Hinton suggested "The Liberty Bell" for the title of Sousa's unnamed march. Coincidentally, Sousa received a letter from his wife saying their son had marched in a parade in honor of the Liberty Bell. Sousa agreed, and he sold "The Liberty Bell" sheet music to the John Church Company for publication; the new march was an immediate success. The march is played as part of an exhibit in the Liberty Bell Center.

The United States Marine Band has played "The Liberty Bell" march at five of the last seven presidential inaugurations: the 1993 inauguration of President Bill Clinton, the 2005 inauguration of President George W. Bush, the 2009 and 2013 inaugurations of President Barack Obama, and the 2017 inauguration of President Donald Trump.

The ship's bell from the SS John Philip Sousa, a World War II Liberty ship, is housed at the Marine Barracks and is used by The President's Own in select performances of the march.

"The Liberty Bell" is also the official march of the Canadian Forces Public Affairs Branch.

Composition 
The march follows the standard form of AABBCDCDC. The trio (sections C and D) uses tubular bells to symbolize the Liberty Bell ringing. The bells usually begin during the first breakstrain (section D), but some bands use them at the first trio (section C).

Instrumentation 

This is scored for 2 flutes, 2 oboes, 2 clarinets, 2 bassoons, 4 horns, 2 trumpets, 3 trombones, tuba, timpani, cymbals, bass drum, snare drum, and strings.

Use in Monty Python's Flying Circus 
The march is best known today with being associated with the British TV comedy program Monty Python's Flying Circus (1969–1974), which used the version performed by the Band of the Grenadier Guards and published in 1893 as a signature tune to avoid copyright fees. Terry Gilliam, the only American member of the troupe, advocated using the theme. He has said the piece was chosen because the troupe thought it would not be associated with the program's content, and that the first bell strike and subsequent melody would give the impression of getting "straight down to business."

The Monty Python mode of presenting the tune was with a single strike of the bell, lifted from the third section and increased in volume, followed by a strain of each of the first two sections, followed by the famous stomping foot animation and a noticeably flatulent "splat" sound reminiscent of a whoopee cushion (the first 13 episodes used a "raspberry"). At the end of the film Monty Python Live at the Hollywood Bowl, the entire march was played over the closing credits.

Uses in other popular culture 
SpaceX used the march as background music for their viral video How Not to Land an Orbital Rocket Booster, a compilation of failed booster landings to celebrate their efforts in pioneering orbital launch vehicle reusability.

See also 
 List of marches by John Philip Sousa
 "Chimes of Liberty" by Edwin Franko Goldman

References

External links 
 The Liberty Bell (audio file) – In MIDI format; from the John Philip Sousa website maintained by David Lovrien, hosted by the Dallas Wind Symphony
 The Monty Python version (archived) – In MP2 format; from the same website
 An 1896 Recording (Probably the first) played by the Edison Grand Concert Band, from the Internet Archive
 Sheet music for a piano arrangement, courtesy of the Mutopia Project

American military marches
Sousa marches
1893 compositions
Concert band pieces
Monty Python
Songs written by John Philip Sousa
Comedy television theme songs